"No Time for Tears" is a song released by English DJ and producer Nathan Dawe and by British girl group Little Mix. It was released on 25 November 2020 by Atlantic Records UK and Warner Music UK. The song was written by Jade Thirlwall, MNEK, along with Nathan Dawe, and Tre Jean-Marie; the latter who also  produced the single. It was the last single that Little Mix released as a quartet, before Jesy Nelson left the group in December 2020. The track reached number nineteen on the UK Singles Chart and was certified silver by the British Phonographic Industry (BPI). It was later included on the expanded edition of Little Mix's sixth studio album Confetti (2020).

Background and composition
The song was announced on 23 November 2020 on both Dawe's and Little Mix's social media accounts. The song was written by Jade Thirlwall, Nathan Dawe, Tre Jean-Marie and MNEK.

Music video
The music video was announced on 13 January.
The video was released on 15 January.

Promotion
A lyric video for the song was released on 28 November 2020 on Dawe's official YouTube channel. Physical copies of the song went available for pre-order on 17 December 2020 on Nathan Dawe's official website and were released on 22 January 2021. A remix of the song by HUGEL was released on 31 December 2020. The next day, 1 January 2021, an acoustic version was released. On 22 January, a remix of the song by Mark Knight was released. A VIP remix was released on 5 February 2021, and a remix featuring British rapper Lady Leshurr was released on 4 March 2021.

Track listing 
Digital single
"No Time for Tears" – 3:16

Digital download/streaming
"No Time for Tears" (HUGEL remix) – 3:08

Digital download/streaming
"No Time for Tears" (acoustic) – 3:25

Digital download/streaming
"No Time for Tears" (Mark Knight remix) – 3:25

Digital download/streaming
"No Time for Tears" (VIP remix) – 3:06

Digital download/streaming
"No Time for Tears" (Lady Leshurr remix) – 3:16

Maxi single (CD single/cassette single) 
"No Time for Tears" – 3:20
"No Time for Tears" (acoustic) – 3:25
"No Time for Tears" (HUGEL remix) – 3:08

Credits and personnel
Credits adapted from Tidal and maxi single liners.

Recording locations

RAK Studios, London (UK)
Metropolis, London (UK)
Stardelta Audio Mastering, Devon (UK)

Personnel

 Nathan Dawe – producer
 Little Mix – vocals
 Tre Jean-Marie – producer, bass, drums, mixer, piano, programmer, strings, synthesizer, vocal producer
 Uzoechi Emenike – vocal producer
 Niamh Murphy – backing vocals
 Paul Norris – vocal engineer
 Lewis Hopkin – mastering

Charts

Certifications

Release history

References

2020 singles
2020 songs
Nathan Dawe songs
Little Mix songs
Songs written by MNEK
Songs written by Tre Jean-Marie